Oxynoe benchijigua is a species of small sea snail or sea slug, a bubble snail, a marine gastropod mollusk in the family Oxynoidae.

Distribution
It is endemic to Canary Islands. It is known only from island La Gomera.

The type locality for this species is "Playa del Barranco de Avalos", La Gomera, Canary Islands.

References

External links 
 Oxynoe benchijigua photos
 Taxonomic details on World Register of Marine Species 

Oxynoidae
Gastropods described in 1999